This Harness Can't Ride Anything is the second album by Chicago indie pop band Chin Up Chin Up, released October 10, 2006 on Suicide Squeeze Records.

Track listing 
 "This Harness Can't Ride Anything" – 4:43
 "Water Planes in Snow" – 3:47
 "We've Got To Keep Running" – 3:52
 "Islands Sink" – 3:41
 "Mansioned" – 3:55
 "I Need a Friend With a Boat" – 4:27
 "Blankets Like Beavers" – 4:45
 "Landlocked Lifeguards" – 5:02
 "Stolen Mountains" – 3:09
 "Trophies For Hire" – 4:22

References

External links
SuicideSqueeze.net

Suicide Squeeze Records albums
Chin Up Chin Up albums
2006 albums